Rebecca Gilman (born 1965 in Birmingham, Alabama) is an American playwright.

Education
She attended Middlebury College, graduated from Birmingham-Southern College, and earned a Master of Fine Arts from the Iowa Playwrights Workshop at the University of Iowa.

Career
Gilman was the first American playwright to win an Evening Standard Award. She serves on the advisory board for Chicago Dramatists. She has received the 2008 Harper Lee Award.

Her most widely known works are Spinning Into Butter, a play that addresses political correctness and racial identity, and Boy Gets Girl, which was included in Time Magazine'''s List of the Best Plays and Musicals of the Decade.

A production of her adaptation of The Heart is a Lonely Hunter was the occasion of a protest by actors who felt only a deaf person should play a deaf person on stage. She currently teaches at Texas Tech University's
School of Theatre and Dance as Head of Playwriting.

When asked about her influences, she remarked that "I'm a big fan of Wallace Shawn. He's incredibly smart and the only writer who writes about intellectuals in a complicated and even contradictory way. He's really funny, too. I also like Donald Margulies, Kenneth Lonergan, and Conor McPherson...Caryl Churchill, Kia Corthron, and a Chicago playwright, Jamie Pachino."

Plays
  Swing State (2022)Twilight Bowl (2019)
 Luna Gale (2014)Dollhouse, adapted from Henrik Ibsen's play (2010)The Crowd You're In With (2009)Lord Butterscotch and the Curse of the Darkwater Phantom (co-written with Lisa Dillman and Brett Neveu, 2007)The Heart Is a Lonely Hunter (2005), adapted from the novel by Carson McCullersThe Boys are Coming Home (book by Gilman, music and lyrics by Leslie Arden, 2005)The Sweetest Swing in Baseball (2004)The American in Me (2001)The Glory of Living (2001)Blue Surge (2001)Spinning Into Butter (2000)Boy Gets Girl (2000)The Crime of the Century (1999)My Sin and Nothing More (1997)The Land of Little Horses (1997)

Personal life and awards

Rebecca Gilman was born in 1965 in Trussville, Alabama, a suburb of Birmingham. She currently resides in Chicago.  Her plays deal with contemporary societal issues.

Gilman received the Scott McPherson Award for her play The Glory of Living. This award is a commission given by the Goodman Theatre in memory of the late playwright Scott McPherson.  The Glory of Living (2001) also earned her an M. Elizabeth Osborn Award, an After Dark Award, a Jeff Citation, the George Devine Award, and the Evening Standard Award for Most Promising Playwright . The Glory of Living earned her a finalist nomination for the Pulitzer Prize.

Gilman received the Roger L. Stevens Award from the Kennedy Center Fund for New American Plays as well as a Jeff Award for Spinning into Butter''. According to Chris Jones, this play made her "One of America's most talked-about and sought-after playwrights."

She has also been awarded Illinois Arts Council playwriting fellowship.

Rebecca Gilman was an associate professor of playwriting and screenwriting at Northwestern University from 2006 to 2019 and is now a professor and head of playwriting at Texas Tech University. She is an artistic associate at the Goodman Theatre and also serves on the board of the Dramatists Guild of America.

References

External links
 Rebecca Gilman's alumna page at the Birmingham Southern College website 
 Rebecca Gilman - Eclipse Theatre Company's 2006 featured playwright

20th-century American dramatists and playwrights
Middlebury College alumni
University of Iowa alumni
1964 births
Living people
Birmingham–Southern College alumni
21st-century American dramatists and playwrights
20th-century American women writers
21st-century American women writers
American women dramatists and playwrights
People from Trussville, Alabama
Writers from Alabama